Avraham Taviv (born 1889, died 20 April 1950) was an Israeli politician.

Biography
Born in Yemen Vilayet in the Ottoman Empire, Taviv received a religious Jewish education, before working as a jeweler and repairing weapons. He made aliyah to Ottoman-controlled Palestine in 1908 in the first caravan from Yemen. He joined Hapoel Hatzair and later Ahdut HaAvoda. In 1918 he was elected to Rishon LeZion's village council. An activist for Yemenite immigrants, he helped establish four Yemenite neighbourhoods in various cities and towns, and was the Yemenite settlements' representative on the Jewish Agency's Aliyah Committee.

In 1920 he attended the founding convention of the Histadrut trade union (and was later elected to its Agricultural Association), and in the same year he was elected to the first Assembly of Representatives. He served on the Jewish National Council until 1931, and again from 1944 until 1948. In 1923 he established the Yemenite Association, which he led until his death. In 1945 he joined Mapai, and was elected to the first Knesset on its list in 1949. He died on 20 April 1950, and was replaced by Yitzhak Kanav.

References

External links

1889 births
1950 deaths
Israeli Jews
Yemenite Jews
Yemeni emigrants to the Ottoman Empire
Jewish National Council members
Israeli trade unionists
Members of the Assembly of Representatives (Mandatory Palestine)
Members of the 1st Knesset (1949–1951)
Yemenite Association politicians
Mapai politicians
Israeli people of Yemeni-Jewish descent